John Joseph Carona (born 14 December 1955) 
is a former Republican member of the Texas Senate from District 16 in Dallas County, Texas.

Texas State Senate

In the 2013 legislative session, Carona chaired the Senate Committee on Business and Commerce. He was also a member of the Senate Criminal Justice, Education, Jurisprudence and Redistricting committees.

In May 2012, acrimony between Carona and colleague Dan Patrick of Houston, a fellow Republican and Baptist, was widely reported throughout the state. In an email exchange, Patrick accused Carona of spreading false rumors about Patrick's marriage; Carona denied having questioned Patrick's marriage or having made comments about Patrick's sexuality. Carona further said to Patrick: "I've never been shy about sharing my dislike and distrust of you. Put bluntly, I believe you are a snake oil salesman, a narcissist that would say anything to draw attention to himself."

Business 
Carona is director, CEO, and president of Associations, Inc. aka "Associa". Associa is a holding company for one of the largest collections of HOA management companies and related businesses in the United States. Carona has come under scrutiny for his business practices and his legislative activity including authoring, voting on, and modifying legislation that benefited his Associa organization.

Personal life
Born in Texas City, Texas, Carona was a resident of East Dallas since early childhood, but now lives in Preston Hollow. He was educated in the Dallas Independent School District and graduated from Bryan Adams High School. In 1978, he received two Bachelor of Business Administration degrees in insurance and real estate from the University of Texas at Austin in 1978.

Election history
Senate election history of Carona from 1998.

Most recent elections

2014

Previous elections

2012

2008

2004

2002

1998

References

External links
Senate of Texas - Senator John Carona
Project Vote Smart - Senator John J. Carona (TX) profile

1955 births
Living people
Republican Party Texas state senators
Hispanic and Latino American state legislators in Texas
Presidents pro tempore of the Texas Senate
Republican Party members of the Texas House of Representatives
People from Dallas
People from Texas City, Texas
Bryan Adams High School alumni
McCombs School of Business alumni
Businesspeople from Texas
Baptists from Texas
American politicians of Mexican descent
21st-century American politicians